Tommy Wirkola (born 6 December 1979) is a Norwegian film director and writer.

Career
His first film was 2007's Kill Buljo, which he co-wrote with Stig Frode Henriksen. They later made the 2009 horror comedy Dead Snow. In 2010 they again collaborated on the film Kurt Josef Wagle and the Legend of the Fjord Witch. In 2012 a television series directed & produced by Wirkola called Hellfjord premiered, consisting of seven 30-minute episodes. His first English-language film, which was also his first large-budget film, was Hansel & Gretel: Witch Hunters, which was co-written by Dante Harper and released in 2013. In 2014 a sequel to Dead Snow, named Dead Snow 2: Red vs. Dead, was released. What Happened to Monday, a science fiction film starring Noomi Rapace and Willem Dafoe, and The Trip, also starring Rapace, were released in 2017 and 2021 respectively. His most recent film, Violent Night, was released in December 2022.

Filmography 

Acting roles

References

External links 
 

1979 births
Bond University alumni
Living people
Norwegian film directors
Norwegian screenwriters
Norwegian film producers
People from Alta, Norway
Norwegian people of Finnish descent
Horror film directors